The FK postcode area, also known as the Falkirk postcode area, is a group of 21 postcode districts in central Scotland, within 18 post towns. These cover most of the Falkirk council area (including Falkirk itself, Grangemouth, Larbert, Denny and Bonnybridge), most of the Stirling council area (including Stirling itself, Dunblane, Doune, Callander, Lochearnhead, Crianlarich and Killin) and Clackmannanshire (including Alloa, Clackmannan, Menstrie, Alva, Tillicoultry and Dollar), plus small parts of Fife, Perth and Kinross, and Argyll and Bute.



Coverage
The approximate coverage of the postcode districts:

|-
! FK1
| FALKIRK
| Falkirk (centre and south), Avonbridge, California, Camelon, Limerigg, Shieldhill, Slamannan, Standburn
| Falkirk
|-
! FK2
| FALKIRK
| Falkirk (north), Airth, Bainsford, Brightons, Carron, Carronshore, Dunmore, Laurieston, Maddiston, Polmont, Redding, Skinflats, Westquarter
| Falkirk, Stirling
|-
! FK3
| GRANGEMOUTH
| Grangemouth, Glensburgh
| Falkirk
|-
! FK4
| BONNYBRIDGE
| Bonnybridge, Allandale, Banknock, Dennyloanhead, Greenhill, Haggs, High Bonnybridge, Longcroft
| Falkirk
|-
! FK5
| LARBERT
| Larbert, Stenhousemuir, Torwood
| Falkirk
|-
! FK6
| DENNY
| Denny, Dunipace, Fankerton, Head of Muir, Stoneywood
| Falkirk
|-
! FK7
| STIRLING
| Stirling (south and east), Bannockburn, Cambusbarron, Cowie, Fallin, Plean, South Alloa, St. Ninians
| Stirling, Falkirk
|-
! FK8
| STIRLING
| Stirling (centre and west), Aberfoyle, Arnprior, Buchlyvie,  Gargunnock, Gartmore, Inversnaid, Kippen, Port of Menteith, Ruskie, Thornhill
| Stirling
|-
! FK9
| STIRLING
| Stirling (north), Bridge of Allan, Blair Drummond, Blairlogie, Cambuskenneth, Lecropt
| Stirling
|-
! rowspan="2"|FK10
| ALLOA
| Alloa, Cambus, Kincardine, Sauchie, Tullibody
| Clackmannanshire, Fife
|-
| CLACKMANNAN
| Clackmannan, Kennet
| Clackmannanshire
|-
! FK11
| MENSTRIE
| Menstrie
| Clackmannanshire
|-
! FK12
| ALVA
| Alva
| Clackmannanshire
|-
! FK13
| TILLICOULTRY
| Tillicoultry, Coalsnaughton, Devonside
| Clackmannanshire
|-
! FK14
| DOLLAR
| Dollar, Blairingone, Burnfoot, Glendevon, Pool of Muckhart, Solsgirth
| Clackmannanshire, Perth and Kinross
|-
! FK15
| DUNBLANE
| Dunblane, Braco, Greenloaning, Kinbuck
| Stirling, Perth and Kinross
|-
! FK16
| DOUNE
| Doune, Argaty, Buchany, Deanston
| Stirling
|-
! FK17
| CALLANDER
| Callander, Brig o' Turk, Kilmahog
| Stirling
|-
! FK18
| CALLANDER
| Ardchullarie More, Strathyre
| Stirling
|-
! FK19
| LOCHEARNHEAD
| Lochearnhead, Ardvorlich, Balquhidder, Edinample, Kingshouse
| Stirling
|-
! FK20
| CRIANLARICH
| Crianlarich, Ardchyle, Auchlyne, Luib, Tyndrum
| Stirling, Argyll and Bute
|-
! FK21
| KILLIN
| Killin, Ardeonaig, Auchmore, Clachaig, Glenlochay, Kinnell
| Stirling
|}

Map

See also
Postcode Address File
List of postcode areas in the United Kingdom

References

External links
Royal Mail's Postcode Address File
A quick introduction to Royal Mail's Postcode Address File (PAF)

Falkirk (council area)
Postcode areas covering Scotland